John Jones (born on 9 January 1966) is an Australian former professional rugby league footballer who played in the 1980s and 1990s. He played for the Manly-Warringah Sea Eagles and South Queensland Crushers, and primarily played  forward.

Playing career
When he was a local junior, Jones had to bide his time in reserve grade; he eventually made his first grade debut at the age of 23 for the Manly-Warringah Sea Eagles in their 19−14 loss to the Cronulla-Sutherland Sharks in round 15 of the 1989 NSWRL season. 

By the 1990 season, Jones was a regular in the first grade team. In the 1992 season, after playing in all 22 games and scoring 4 tries, Jones finished runner-up to Allan Langer in the Rothmans Medal for best and fairest player during the Winfield Cup competition that season. Jones left the Sea Eagles at the end of the 1994 NSWRL season.

In 1995, Jones moved to the newly formed entity South Queensland Crushers on a three-year deal. Following the demise of the Crushers at the end of the 1997 season, Jones decided to retire from playing. He finished his career having played 109 games and scoring 16 tries. Jones played in the Crusher's last ever game in the top grade, which ended in a 39-18 victory over Western Suburbs in round 22.

References

1966 births
Living people
Australian rugby league players
Manly Warringah Sea Eagles players
South Queensland Crushers players
Rugby league utility players
Rugby league players from Sydney
Rugby league second-rows
Rugby league locks